This is a list of notable people who have studied at Central Saint Martins since its formation in 1989 by amalgamation of the Central School of Art and Design and Saint Martin's School of Art.

For alumni of the original schools before the merger, please see the List of alumni of the Central School of Art and Design and List of alumni of Saint Martin's School of Art.

A
 Faisal Abdu'allah
 Kossi Aguessy
 Sadik Ahmed
 Bora Aksu
 AL and AL (performance art)
 Johan Andersson (artist)
 Eugene Ankomah
 Estrella Archs
 Kali Arulpragasam
 Daniel Askill
 Tom Aspaul
 Ed Atkins 
 Dana Awartani

B
 Faris Badwan
 Elena Bajo
 Bobby Baker (performance artist)
 Luella Bartley
 Sarah Beddington 
 Sunara Begum
 Laura Belém
 Antonio Berardi
 Sara Berman (fashion designer)
 Wales Bonner
 Phoebe Boswell
 Jason Brooks (illustrator)
 Jessica Brown Findlay
 Miriam Buether
 Jay Burridge
 Sarah Burton

C
 Bonnie Camplin
 Jane Carr (fashion designer)
 Robert Cary-Williams
 Charlie Casely-Hayford
 Ella Catliff
 Hussein Chalayan
 Li Chevalier
 Madeleine Child
 Sandra Choi
 Clements Ribeiro
 Jarvis Cocker
 Michal Cole
 Sacha Craddock

D
 Giles Deacon
 Richard Deacon
 Danielle Dean
 Heavenli Denton
 Es Devlin
 Amelia Dimoldenberg
 Emma Dodd
 Jonny Dodge
 Lina Dorado (film-maker)
 Mich Dulce
 Nic Dunlop

F
 Paloma Faith
 Maxwell Fine (Set Decorator Film and Television)
 Philip Firsov (painter and sculptor)
 Anna Fleischle (stage designer)
 Frankmusik
 Rie fu

G
 John Galliano
 Nick Gentry (artist)
 Opashona Ghosh
 Craig Green
 Noémie Goudal
 Ferry Gouw
 Gilbert & George

H
 Michael van der Ham
 Katharine Hamnett 
 PJ Harvey
 Tim Hatley (theatre designer)
 Giles Hattersley
 Emma Healey (novelist)
 Nadia Hebson
 HK119
 Rachael House
 Henry Hudson (artist)
 Frieda Hughes

I
 Roksanda Ilincic

J
 Anthony James (artist)
 Charles Jeffrey (fashion designer)
 Richard E. Jennings (comic book artist)
 Peter Jensen (fashion designer)
 Clare Johnson (artist, writer)
 Masato Jones
 Stephen Jones

K
 Christopher Kane
 Kiko Kostadinov
 Mary Katrantzou
 Jane Kelly
 Darren Kennedy
 Annie Kevans (artist)
 Rachel Khoo (chef)
 Kissy Sell Out (graphic designer)
 Sophia Kokosalaki
 David Koma
 Matthew Krishanu
 Eleni Kyriacou

L
 Jenny Law née Burns (Designer)
 Dimitri Launder (artist)
 Frank Leder
 Tanya Ling
 Cathy Lomax (artist)
 Todd Lynn

M
 Masha Ma
 Goshka Macuga (artist)
 Aida Mahmudova
 Martin Maloney
 Shantell Martin (visual artist)
 Michal Martychowiec (artist)
 Reba Maybury 
 Stella McCartney
 Gary McKendry
 Joss McKinley
 Alexander McQueen
 M.I.A. (rapper)
 Alex Michon
 Ruth Millar
 Savannah Miller
 MRK

N
 Navia Nguyen (model)
 Niyi
 Nima Nourizadeh
 Sonja Nuttall

O
 Mowalola Ogunlesi
 Joshua Oppenheimer (film director)
 Rifat Özbek

P
 Anita Pallenberg
 Elisa Palomino
 Laura Pannack
 Phoebe Philo
 Andy Picci
 Zac Posen
 Laure Prouvost (artist; Turner Prize winner)
 Gareth Pugh
 Marcella Puppini

R
 Sara Rahbar
 Jo Ratcliffe
 Marcus Reeves
 Emma Rendel (artist)
 Lucinda Rogers
 Tal Rosner

S
 Jonathan Saunders
 Burkhard Schittny (visual artist)
 Christopher Shannon
 Raqib Shaw
 Ed Skrein
 Anna Sorokin
 Teresa Nunes Alves de Sousa
 Anna Span (pornographic film producer)
 Helga Stentzel
 Stuart Stockdale
 Tamar and Natasha Surguladze
 Isabella Summers

T
 Lucy Tammam
 Wendy Tan White (entrepreneur)
 Jeremy Tankard (type designer)
 Riccardo Tisci
 Mark Titchner (artist)

V
 Elise Valmorbida
 Tom Vek
 Henrik Vibskov
 Lotta Volkova

W
 Suling Wang (artist) 
 Matthew Williamson
 Louise Wilson
 Joe Wright (filmmaker)
 Anoma Wijewardene (artist)

Z
 Haris Zambarloukos
 Natasha Zinko

See also

References

Central Saint Martins